Ruellia californica is a species of flowering plant in the Acanthus family commonly known as the rama parda or flor del campo. This evergreen shrub is native to the Baja California peninsula and neighboring coastal Sonora. It is characterized by showy, funnelform blue-purple flowers that bloom throughout the year. There are two subspecies, one endemic to Baja California Sur, and they primarily differ in their presence or absence of hairs on their foliage. This plant is cultivated as an ornamental, and is used to provide a colorful accent to desert and dry gardens.

Description 
The foliage consists of ovate to lanceolate to elliptic leaves that are cuneate to rounded at their base. In subspecies californica, the leaves have mostly glandular trichomes. In subspecies peninsularis, the trichomes are absent, with the leaves glossy and smooth, but sticky.

The mature fruits expel the seeds and disperse them in a rapid explosion when wet.

Distribution and habitat 
This species is native to the Baja California peninsula and neighboring coastal Sonora in Mexico. Subspecies californica has the widest distribution, from Bahía de los Ángeles in Baja California to the southern Cape region of Baja California Sur, and on the neighboring Gulf of California islands and western central Sonora. Subspecies peninsularis is endemic to Baja California Sur, and is found from the Sierra de la Giganta and Comondú south to the Cape region.

Both subspecies are usually found growing on dry, gravelly slopes and along bajadas, hillsides, rocky washes, arroyos, and canyons. They are often the only plants in bloom during dry parts of the year.

Gallery

References

External links 
 Ruellia peninsularis treatment at Virtual Library of Phoenix Landscape Plants
 Ruellia californica ssp. peninsularis — UC Photo gallery

californica
Flora of Baja California
Flora of Baja California Sur
Flora of Sonora
Endemic flora of Mexico
Natural history of the Peninsular Ranges